The Women's Africa Cup of Nations, also called the TotalEnergies Women's Africa Cup of Nations for sponsorship reasons and abbreviated to WAFCON, is an international women's football competition held every two years and sanctioned by the Confederation of African Football (CAF). It was first contested in 1991, but was not held biennially until 1998. Nigeria is the most successful nation in the tournament's history, having won a record 11 titles, meaning they have won all but three of the previous tournaments. The three tournaments not won by Nigeria were won by Equatorial Guinea and South Africa; Equatorial Guinea won the two competitions in which it were the host.

The competition has served as a qualifying tournament for the FIFA Women's World Cup every other tournament since its inception in 1991.

History
In 2000, hosts South Africa met three-time champions Nigeria in the final game of the tournament. After Nigeria finished the first half ahead 1–0, Nigeria's Stella Mbachu scored a second goal in the 72nd minute and the home crowd realized there was no coming back. Supporters began hurling bottles and other debris at officials and Nigerian players. The match was abandoned after three attempts at restarts were all interrupted by further disturbances. Riot police began fighting battles with bottle-throwing supporters about 40 minutes after the goal had been allowed, throwing tear gas into the crowd to break up the disturbance. The game and the tournament were awarded to Nigeria. The 2020 edition was cancelled due to the COVID-19 pandemic.

Nomination
On 6 August 2015, the CAF Executive Committee decided to change the name of the tournament from the African Women's Championship to the Women's Africa Cup of Nations, similar to the men's version, Africa Cup of Nations.

Sponsorship
In July 2016, Total has secured an eight-year sponsorship package from the Confederation of African Football (CAF) to support 10 of its principal competitions. In 2021, Total was rebranded to TotalEnergies but it retained its sponsorship for CAF competitions. Due to this sponsorship, the Africa Women Cup of Nations is named "TotalEnergies Africa Women Cup of Nations".

Format
Since the 1998 edition, this competition has been held in two phases: a qualification phase (or called the elimination phase) and a final tournament. The host country of the final tournament is automatically qualified, and in the first editions the defending champion was also qualified for the following tournament.

Qualifying 
The qualification phase has evolved over time according to the increasing number of nations affiliated to the Confederation of African Football (CAF). It was set up from 1998, during the first two editions of the Africa Cup of Nations,...............

Final phase 
Only the hosts received an automatic qualification spot, with the other 11 teams qualifying through a qualification tournament. At the finals, the 12 teams were drawn into three groups of four teams each. The teams in each group played a single round robin.

After the group stage, the top two teams and the two best third-placed teams advanced to the quarter-finals. The winners of the quarter-finals advanced to the semi-finals. The losers of the semi-finals played in a third place play-off, while winners of the semi-finals played in the final.

Trophy and medals
Throughout the history of the Africa Cup of Nations, three trophies have been awarded to the winners of the competition

Results

Note: abd – match abandoned in the 73rd minute

Statistics

Teams reaching the top four

* hosts
** losing semi-finals

Summary (1991–2022)

Top scorers (Golden boot) by year

Best player (Golden ball) by year

Hat-tricks

Participating nations
Legend

 – Champions
 – Runners-up
 – Third place
 – Fourth place
 – Semi-finals
QF – Quarter-finals
GS – Group stage

q – Qualified
 – Did not qualify
 – Did not enter
 – Withdrew before qualification
 — Withdrew/Disqualified after qualification
 – Hosts

Most tournaments hosted

See also 

 CAF Women's Champions League
 African U-20 Women's World Cup qualification
 African U-17 Cup of Nations for Women
 FIFA Women's World Cup
 FIFA U-17 Women's World Cup
 FIFA U-20 Women's World Cup

References

External links

 
 Africa – Women's Championship at the RSSSF

 
Women's Cup of Nations
Confederation of African Football competitions for women's national teams
Recurring sporting events established in 1991
Africa Cup of Nations, Women